Lebanese International University is a university located in the Hadda neighborhood of the southern outskirts of Sana'a, Yemen. It is located south of the Lebanon Heart Hospital and west by road from Aljabowbi Castle. It is a branch of the Lebanese International University, founded in Beqaa.

References

External links 
 

Buildings and structures in Sanaa
Universities in Yemen